Cédric Gerbehaye (born 1977) is a Belgian documentary photographer and a founding member of MAPS Agency. He is the author of the books Congo in Limbo, Land of Cush, Sète#13 and D’entre eux.

Career
Trained as a journalist, Gerbehaye first turned to photography during trips to Indonesia. For his graduation thesis in 2002, he addressed the Israeli-Palestinian conflict in the light of the ineffectiveness of the Oslo Accords. After completing his studies, he reported on the situation in Hebron and Gaza and on the economic crisis in Israel. He has also covered the Kurdish question in Turkey and Iraq. Since 2007, he has reported on the conflicts between the militias and the national army in the eastern Congo.

His work in the Congo was facilitated by the humanitarian organization Aviation sans frontières which flew him into rebel zones and camps in the Ituri and North Kivu provinces where he was able to photograph adults and children involved in both sides of the conflict. He also travelled to remote areas with Médecins Sans Frontières where he reported mainly on the victims, rather than on the violence. "I’m not looking for the combat," he explained. "I’m interested in trying to tell the story of the people." Keen to bring unreported disasters into the open, he thinks of himself as a "concerned photographer". "If there is only a slight possibility that it has an impact, it’s my duty to do it so that people cannot say, 'We didn’t know, we had no clue.'"

Awards
 2006: Prix Photographie Ouverte (two awards)
 2007: Bayeux-Calvados Awards for war correspondents, for Summer Rains
 2008: World Press Photo Award, for Congo in Limbo
 2008: The Olivier Rebbot Award (Overseas Press Club of America), for Congo in Limbo
 2008: Amnesty International Media Award, for Congo in Limbo

Notes

References

External links
 Cédric Gerbehaye at MAPS

1977 births
Living people
Belgian photojournalists